Kiprijan Račanin (Cyprian of Rača; c. 1650–1730) was a Serbian writer and monk who founded a copyist school (Scriptorium) in Szentendre, just like the one he left behind in Serbia -- School of Rača -- at the commencement of the Great Turkish War in 1689. He is remembered as an academically-trained Serbian-born writer and enlightener who laid the foundation for the development of modern Serbian literature, according to literary critic Jovan Skerlić.

It was, incidentally, in the small wooden church, dedicated to the Evangelist Luke, that the Szentenedre Scriptorium and printing office came into being; among the monk-scribes Kiprijan Račanin, Gavrilo Trojičanin, Jerotej Račanin, Čirjak Račanin, Hristifor Račanin, Teodor Račanin, and others.

Little is known about him. It is known, however, that he took orders at the Rača monastery and became a monk-scribe. During the Great Turkish War of 1689-1699 he left central Serbia for Serbian territories up north, bordering Hungary. In Zenta he remained for a while, joining the Christian fray against the Turks in the Battle of Zenta. With Arsenije III Čarnojević he came to settle in Szentendre, where he began to make a name for himself as the dean of a scriptorium, a diligent copyist of manuscripts and books, and writer of one of the early Serbian primers called Bukvar in 1717, an adaptation of a Primer by Russian writer Fedor Polikarpov-Orlov (1660-1731).

Work
He compiled the Буквар словенских писмена ("Primer of Slavic Writings"; 1717), in which he gave the first rules of modern Serbian versification. Among the original works, the most significant is his inspired Стихира светом кнезу Лазару ("Stihira to the Holy Prince Lazarus"; 1692)
 Stichologion
 Liturgical writings

See also
Čirjak Račanin (1660–1731), Serbian Orthodox monk and writer
Jerotej Račanin (1650–1727), Serbian Orthodox monk and writer
Teodor Račanin (1500–1560), Serbian Orthodox monk and writer
Simeon Račanin ( 1676–1700), Serbian Orthodox monk and writer
Hristifor Račanin (1595–1670), Serbian Orthodox monk and writer
Prohor Račanin, Serbian Orthodox monk
Gavrilo Stefanović Venclović
Grigorije Račanin ( 1739), Serbian writer
Jefrem Janković Tetovac

References

Sources
 
 Translated and adapted from Serbian Wikipedia:https://sr.wikipedia.org/wiki/%D0%9A%D0%B8%D0%BF%D1%80%D0%B8%D1%98%D0%B0%D0%BD_%D0%A0%D0%B0%D1%87%D0%B0%D0%BD%D0%B8%D0%BD

Serbian writers
Year of birth uncertain
1730 deaths
Habsburg Serbs
18th-century Serbian writers
Serbian Orthodox clergy
Serbian monks
Refugees of the Great Turkish War